The 1976–77 John Player Cup was the sixth edition of England's premier rugby union club competition at the time. Gosforth won the competition for the second consecutive year defeating Waterloo in the final. The event was sponsored by John Player cigarettes and the final was held at Twickenham Stadium.

Draw and results

First round

Second round

Quarter-finals

Progressed as away team*

Semi-finals

Final

References

1976–77 rugby union tournaments for clubs
1976–77 in English rugby union
RFU Knockout Cup